Rampage is a 1986 Turkish cult action film, written and directed by Çetin Inanç, featuring bodybuilder Serdar Kebapçılar as a Turkish commando who must infiltrate and capture a group of terrorists living in the mountains. The film is the second of two films, along with Wild Blood (Turkish: Vahşi Kan; 1983) also written and directed by Çetin İnanç, commonly known as Turkish Rambo because of plot and stylistic similarities copied from George P. Cosmatos’s Rambo: First Blood Part II (1985). It is also available in an English dubbed U.S. theatrical release produced by Ed Glaser.

Cast

Original Turkish cast
Serdar Kebapçılar as Serdar
Osman Betin as Osman
Yılmaz Kurt as Terrorist #3
Tuğrul Meteer as Captain Ömer
Hüseyin Peyda as Ziya
Filiz Taçbaş as Girl (the name of the female lead is not even given in the film)
Sümer Tilmaç as Sait / Major Fuat
Mehmet Uğur as Terrorist #2
Sami Hazinses as Kid's Father
Mehmet Samsa as Terrorist #1

English dub voice cast
Andy Dallas as Sait
Peter A. Davis as Ziya & Terrorist #3
Steve Glaser as Sergeant & Kid's Father
Eric W. Sizemore as Serdar, Osman & Captain Omer
Jennifer Zahn as Girl
Meagan Benz as Meagan Rachelle
Alex Mitchell
Al Morrison

DVD release 
The film was released on DVD on April 24, 2009, by Dark Maze Studios; But it was discontinued on June 12, 2013.

External links 

1986 films
1986 action films
Rambo (franchise)
Turkish action films
Films set in Turkey
1980s Turkish-language films
Films involved in plagiarism controversies
Films directed by Çetin İnanç
Mockbuster films